The UK Government G-Cloud is an initiative targeted at easing procurement by public-sector bodies in the United Kingdom of commodity information technology services that use cloud computing. The G-Cloud consists of:
 A series of framework agreements with suppliers, from which public sector organisations can buy services without needing to run a full tender or competition procurement process
 An online store – the "Digital Marketplace" (previously "CloudStore"), which allows public sector bodies to search for services that are covered by the G-Cloud frameworks

The service began in 2012, and had several calls for contracts.
By May 2013 there were over 700 suppliers—over 80% of which were small and medium-sized enterprises. £18.2 million (US$27.7 million) of sales were made by April 2013. With the adoption of "cloud first" policy in UK in May 2013  the sales have continued to grow, reportedly hitting over £50M in February 2014. These are based on procurement of some 1,200 providers and 13,000 services, including both cloud services and (professional) specialist services as of November 2013.

Overview 
The UK Government initiated the G-Cloud programme to deliver computing based capability (from fundamental resources such as storage and processing to full-fledged applications) using cloud computing.
G-Cloud established framework agreements with service providers; and lists those services on a publicly accessible portal known as the Digital Marketplace. Public Sector organisations can call off the services listed on the Digital Marketplace without needing to go through a full tender process.

After plans were announced in March 2011, the government aimed to shift 50% of new government IT spending to cloud based services by 2015  and diversify the supplier base to give greater opportunity to small and medium-sized enterprises (SMEs).. The "cloud first" approach to IT, mandated that the central government purchases IT services through the cloud unless it can be proven that an alternative is more cost effective.

In June 2013 G-Cloud moved to become part of Government Digital Service (GDS) with the director Denise McDonagh moving to be CTO of the Home Office. Tony Singleton, COO of GDS, took over as director of G-Cloud.

A new version of the G-Cloud framework is normally released about every 6 to 9 months, for example G-Cloud version 9 went live in May 2017. G-Cloud 12 was initially to run from 28 September 2020 to 27 September 2021 but it was extended in April 2021 and now runs to 27 September 2022.

Framework agreements

Calls 
G-Cloud had several calls for contract to establish framework agreements.

Major US vendors Amazon Web Services (AWS) and Google were initially excluded by the UK government in 2012 (G-Cloud 3) but AWS has since been added in 2013 (G-Cloud 4) and Google in 2018 (ref). 

Following hints by the head of the programme, GDS chief operating officer Tony Singleton, that the call for G-Cloud 4 would be open by the "end of July", the G-Cloud 4 call opened on the 6 August 2013. The blog entry also stated that the tendering process has been improved, with the use of the Government Procurement Service.

G-Cloud expected to make calls roughly every three to six months, but with no fixed frequency. Contract calls are listed on the Government Contract Finder website.

In April 2013 the G-Cloud V call for framework contracts was listed as starting in March 2014. G-Cloud V opened on 25 February 2014.

The press noted the name of the G-Cloud call for framework agreements moved from suffixing the call with Roman numerals (G-Cloud I, II and III) to using the Arabic numeral 4.

Classifications 
Suppliers define the service that they are offering as part of the framework agreement, and those details will be made available in the Digital Marketplace. These details include such things as Business Impact Level (e.g. IL2) that the service is accredited for, and how users will be on-boarded and off-boarded. In particular is the requirement to enable users to leave the service (off-board) if they wish to move to a different provider of the same service.

As of G-Cloud 9, services are classified into 3 lots:

 Lot 1: Cloud Hosting (IaaS) and (PaaS): Cloud platform or infrastructure services that can help buyers do at least 1 of: deploy, manage and run software and provision and use processing, storage or networking resources
 Lot 2: Cloud Software (SaaS): Applications that are typically accessed over a public or private network e.g. the internet and hosted in the cloud
 Lot 3: Cloud Support

Digital Marketplace 
The Digital Marketplace (previously CloudStore) is a publicly accessible, searchable database of services offered under G-Cloud. The first service was offered in February 2012.

Following criticism of the original CloudStore interface, CloudStore was substantially reworked by May 2013. In 2014, the Government Digital Service announced  it would be replacing the CloudStore with a new platform called the "Digital Marketplace", currently in beta. The Digital Marketplace aims to integrate the Digital Services framework in 2015 and ultimately other framework contracts. Services can be searched by free text search as well as by continual narrowing of the field using various search criteria such as business impact level supported, cost, deployment model (e.g. Public Cloud, Private Cloud).

Procurement 
The Digital Marketplace procurement processes handle selection and procurement of services. They do not replace internal processes for securing funds. However, assuming funds are available, procurement from the Digital Marketplace does not require a full tender or mini-competition.

External links 
 Official website

References 

Cloud platforms
2012 establishments in the United Kingdom
Government of the United Kingdom
Government services web portals in the United Kingdom
Information technology organisations based in the United Kingdom